Douglas Edward James-Taylor (born 18 November 2001) is an English professional footballer who plays as a forward for Walsall on loan from Stoke City.

Club career
James-Taylor grew up in Altrincham where he attended Altrincham Grammar School for Boys. He began his football career with Salford City and was a prolific goalscorer for their under-18s which saw him make his senior debut in a FA Trophy game at Maidstone United. He joined the Stoke City U23s in September 2020. He gained first team experience in the second half of the 2021–22 season playing four times for Wealdstone and ten times for AFC Fylde.

On 1 July 2022, James-Taylor joined Walsall on loan for the 2022–23 season. He made his Football League debut on 30 July 2022 in a 4–0 victory against Hartlepool United.

Career statistics

References

2001 births
Living people
English footballers
Salford City F.C. players
Stoke City F.C. players
Wealdstone F.C. players
AFC Fylde players
Walsall F.C. players
Association football forwards
National League (English football) players
English Football League players